Jean Combaz (1896-1974) was a Belgian architect. He designed the Église Sainte-Suzanne in Schaerbeek, Brussels.

References

1896 births
1974 deaths
20th-century Belgian architects